William Angus may refer to:

Nobility
 William Douglas, 2nd Earl of Angus (c. 1398–1437), Scottish nobleman and soldier
 William Douglas, 9th Earl of Angus (1533–1591), Scottish nobleman
 William Douglas, 10th Earl of Angus (1552–1611), Scottish nobleman

Others
William Angus (VC) (1888–1959), Celtic footballer and Victoria Cross recipient
William Angus (Fulham footballer) on List of Fulham F.C. players (1–24 appearances) 
 William Angus (Australian politician) (1871–1965), South Australian Lower House politician and agriculturist 
 William Angus (engraver) (1752–1821), English engraver from Islington, Middlesex
 William Angus (British politician) (1841–1912), president of the National Liberal Federation in the United Kingdom
 William Angus, escaped prisoner from the St. Michael of Scarborough

See also